Microsentis is a genus of worms belonging to the family Neoechinorhynchidae.

The species of this genus are found in Northern America.

Species
Species:
 Microsentis wardae Martin & Multani, 1966

References

Neoechinorhynchidae
Acanthocephala genera